A Racial Program for the Twentieth Century (occasionally A Radical Program for the Twentieth Century) was a hoax that first gained public notoriety on June 7, 1957, during a debate on the Civil Rights Act of 1957, when Rep. Thomas Abernethy of Mississippi read a reputed quotation from it into the Congressional Record:

We must realize that our party's most powerful weapon is racial tensions. By propounding into the consciousness of the dark races that for centuries they have been oppressed by whites, we can mold them to the program of the Communist Party. In America we will aim for subtle victory. While inflaming the Negro minority against the whites, we will endeavor to instill in the whites a guilt complex for their exploitation of the Negroes. We will aid the Negroes to rise in prominence in every walk of life, in the professions and in the world of sports and entertainment. With this prestige, the Negro will be able to intermarry with the whites and begin a process which will deliver America to our cause.

Abernethy had found the quotation in a March 1957 letter to the editor of The Washington Star; he claimed it as proof that the Civil Rights Movement was a foreign Communist plot. However, The Washington Star soon apologized for having printed the quotation without verifying its authenticity and, on February 18, 1958, published an article entitled "Story of a Phony Quotation--A Futile Effort to Pin It Down--'A Racial Program for the 20th Century' Seems to Exist Only in Somebody's Imagination", which traced the quotation to Eustace Mullins, who claimed to have found it in a Zionist publication in the Library of Congress.

On August 30 of that year, Rep. Abraham J. Multer of New York read the Star article into the Congressional Record and raised several other points challenging the quotation's authenticity. These included the nonexistence of a British Communist party in 1912 (it was founded in 1920) and the nonexistence of a British Communist author named Israel Cohen. Although a British Jewish author and Zionist named Israel Cohen did exist in that period, he had no affiliation with Communism nor is there any record of him writing such a work. A Racial Program does not exist either in the Library of Congress or in the British Museum Catalogue of Printed Books.

Related
Eustace Mullins also invented the fabricated speech Our Race Will Rule Undisputed Over The World under the different alias of "Rabbi Emanuel Rabinovich".

See also
 List of hoaxes
 Miscegenation: The Theory of the Blending of the Races, Applied to the American White Man and Negro

References

Antisemitic forgeries
Hoaxes in the United States
Anti-communism in the United States
1950s hoaxes
Far-right publications in the United States
1957 documents
White genocide conspiracy theory
Racial hoaxes
Antisemitism in the United States